Thornbury Castle is a Tudor castle in the place of Thornbury, in Gloucestershire, England, situated next to the parish church of St Mary, founded in the Norman era. Construction was begun in 1511 as a further residence for Edward Stafford, 3rd Duke of Buckingham (1478-1521), of Stafford Castle in Staffordshire. It is not a true military fortress but rather an early example of a Tudor country house, with minimal defensive attributes. As at Richmond Palace in Surrey, the main ranges of Thornbury framed courts, of which the symmetrical entrance range, with central gatehouse and octagonal corner towers, survives, together with two less regular side ranges with many irregular projecting features and towers. It is now a grade I listed building that is operated as a hotel.

History
The site was occupied by a manor house in 930; Jasper Tudor, Duke of Bedford & Earl of Pembroke, died in the Manor House in 1495. Part of the original plans for a very grand residence were "well advanced", with a Licence to crenellate being granted in 1508, before the 3rd Duke of Buckingham was beheaded for treason in 1521, by order of King Henry VIII.

Following the 3rd Duke's death Thornbury was confiscated by King Henry VIII of England, who stayed there for ten days in August 1535 with Queen Anne Boleyn. In 1554 Queen Mary granted the castle and manor to Henry Stafford, 1st Baron Stafford. Following the Civil War, the castle fell into disrepair, but was renovated in 1824 by the Howard family.

Today
The castle is now a 26-room luxury hotel and restaurant, and a venue for weddings. Between 1966 and 1986 the castle was operated as one of the UK's top restaurants by Kenneth Bell MBE with staff including food writer Nigel Slater<ref>'Toast: The Story of a Boy's Hunger'', Fourth Estate Ltd, (2003) or HarperPerennial (2004)</ref> and MasterChef New Zealand judge Simon Gault early in their culinary careers.

A report in March 2022 indicated that all of the bedrooms and suites of the hotel had been refurbished. Since November 2021, the property had been a member of Relais & Châteaux. 

Locomotive
There was a GWR Castle class 4-6-0 locomotive in preservation named 7027 Thornbury Castle. In August 2022 the future restoration of Thornbury Castle was called into question when the Great Western Society's 4709 Group'' bought the locomotive with the intention of donating the boiler to their project to re-create a GWR 4700 Class. Thornbury Castle's chassis and other components are to be used to recreate a GWR Star class locomotive.

Images

See also
 Castles in Great Britain and Ireland
 List of castles in England

References

External links

 Thornbury Castle website
 A1tourism.com article about Thornbury Castle
 alltouristattractions about Thornbury Castle
 Description of Stephen Edgar's furniture and interiors at Thornbury Castle
 on Google maps

Houses completed in the 16th century
Castles in Gloucestershire
+
Buildings and structures in South Gloucestershire District
Grade I listed buildings in Gloucestershire
Grade I listed castles
Restaurants in Gloucestershire
Hotels in Gloucestershire
Thornbury, Gloucestershire